Pedro Henrique Casagrande Oliveira (born 12 May 1999), known as simply Casagrande, is a Brazilian professional footballer who plays as a defender for Covilhã, on loan from Portimonense.

Professional career
A youth product of Londrina, Casagrande moved to Portugal with  Portimonense in 2019 and was originally a part of their U23 side. Casagrande made his professional debut with Portimonense in a 5–1 Primeira Liga win over C.D. Nacional on 2 April 2021.

References

External links
 
 
 Portimonense FC

1999 births
Living people
Sportspeople from Londrina
Brazilian footballers
Portimonense S.C. players
S.C. Covilhã players
Primeira Liga players
Liga Portugal 2 players
Association football defenders
Brazilian expatriate footballers
Brazilian expatriates in Portugal
Expatriate footballers in Portugal